Manoyan is an Armenian surname. Notable people with the surname include:

David Manoyan (born 1990), Armenian footballer
Giro Manoyan (born 1962), Armenian politician

Armenian-language surnames